Christopher J. H. Wright (born 1947) is a missiologist, an Anglican clergyman and an Old Testament scholar. He is currently the International Ministries Director of Langham Partnership International. He was the principal of All Nations Christian College. He is an honorary member of All Souls Church, Langham Place in London, UK.

Life

Childhood and education
Wright was born in Belfast, Northern Ireland, in 1947. His parents were missionaries in Brazil, though Chris as the youngest son was born after they came back at the end of the Second World War. He grew up in Belfast and was nurtured as an Irish Presbyterian. He studied classics at St. Catharine's College, Cambridge in the 1960s, and then started his career as a high-school teacher in Grosvenor High School, Belfast. In the 1970s he studied for his PhD at Cambridge University in Cambridge, England, in the field of Theology, specialising in Old Testament economic ethics; his book from this work was published as God's People in God's Land (Eerdmans and Paternoster).

Early professional experience
Wright was ordained in the Anglican Church of England in 1977 and served as an assistant pastor in the Parish Church of St. Peter & St. Paul, Tonbridge, Kent, England.

Foreign mission service
In 1983 Wright moved to India with his wife, Liz, and four children to teach at Union Biblical Seminary (UBS) in Pune for five years. At this time he and Liz were mission partners with Crosslinks, an evangelical Anglican mission agency. While at UBS he taught a variety of Old Testament courses at B.D. and M.Th. levels.

All Nations Christian College
In 1988 Wright returned to the UK as academic dean at All Nations Christian College, an international training centre for crosscultural mission. He was appointed principal there in September 1993 and held that post for eight years.

Current role
In September 2001 Wright was appointed to his present role as the International Ministries Director of the Langham Partnership International (LPI).

Wright and his wife belong to All Souls Church, Langham Place, where he enjoys preaching from time to time as a member of the ministry team. This is also the church where LPI's founder, John Stott, was rector emeritus.

Personal life
Wright enjoys running, birding and watching rugby football. He has a passion to bring to life the relevance of the Old Testament to Christian mission and ethics. He has written several books mostly on that area. He loves preaching and teaching the Bible, which he does now mostly through the Langham Preaching seminars in different parts of the world. When not travelling around the world for this ministry, and giving international leadership to LPI, Chris gives about three months of each year to his continuing writing projects.

Wright and his wife Liz live in London and have four adult children and 11 grandchildren(Daisy, Dylan, Simeon, Joseph, Lawrence, Josh, Ellie, Isabel, Ethan, Samuel, Benjamin).

He is of no relation to N.T. Wright

Writing 
 User's Guide to the Bible (Lion Manuals), Chariot Victor, 1984
 God's People in God's Land: Family, Land and Property in the Old Testament. Grand Rapids: Eerdmans; Exeter, UK: Paternoster, 1990
 Knowing Jesus through the Old Testament, Harpercollins, 1990
 Tested by Fire. Daniel 1-6: Solid Faith in today’s world, Scripture Union, 1993
 Walking in the Ways of the Lord: The Ethical Authority of the Old Testament, Intervarsity Press, 1995
 Deuteronomy (New International Biblical Commentary),Hendrickson, 1996
 The Uniqueness of Jesus. Thinking Clearly Series. Mill Hill, London and Grand Rapids: Monarch. Reprint 2001. Available in the United States through Kregel Publications, P.O. Box 2607, Grand Rapids, MI 49501), 1997
 The Message of Ezekiel (The Bible Speaks Today), Intervarsity Press, 2001
 Old Testament Ethics for the People of God. Leicester, England, and Downers Grove, Ill.: Inter-Varsity Press. Revised, updated and expanded version of Living as the People of God and An Eye for an Eye, 2004
 The Mission of God: Unlocking the Bible's Grand Narrative, IVP Academic, 2006
 Life Through God's Word: Psalm 119, Milton Keynes, Authentic and Keswick Ministries, 2006
 Knowing the Holy Spirit through the Old Testament,  Oxford: Monarch Press; Downers Grove: IVP, 2006
 Knowing God the Father Through the Old Testament, IVP Academic, 2007
 Salvation Belongs to Our God: Celebrating the Bible's Central Story, Global Christian Library, Nottingham: IVP;  Christian Doctrine in Global Perspective, Downers Grove: IVP, 2008 	
 The God I Don't Understand: Reflections on Tough Questions of Faith, Grand Rapids: Zondervan, 2009 	
 Mission of God's People The (Biblical Theology for Life), Grand Rapids: Zondervan, 2010
 Sweeter than Honey, Langham Preaching Resources, 2015
 Becoming like Jesus, Langham Preaching Resources, 2016
 How to Preach and Teach the Old Testament for All Its Worth, Zondervan Academic, 2016
 Let the Gospels Preach the Gospel, Langham Preaching Resources, 2017

References

External links 
 Langham Partnership International
 All Souls Church

1947 births
20th-century Anglican theologians
20th-century Church of England clergy
20th-century English theologians
British biblical scholars
English Anglican theologians
Evangelical Anglican biblical scholars
Evangelical Anglican clergy
Living people
Old Testament scholars
Clergy from Belfast
Bible commentators